Lactalbumin, alpha-, also known as LALBA, is a protein that in humans is encoded by the LALBA gene.

Overview 

α-Lactalbumin is a protein that regulates the production of lactose in the milk of almost all mammalian species.  In primates, alpha-lactalbumin expression is upregulated in response to the hormone prolactin and increases the production of lactose.

α-Lactalbumin forms the regulatory subunit of the lactose synthase (LS) heterodimer and β-1,4-galactosyltransferase (beta4Gal-T1) forms the catalytic component. Together, these proteins enable LS to produce lactose by transferring galactose moieties to glucose.  As a multimer, alpha-lactalbumin strongly binds calcium and zinc ions and may possess bactericidal or antitumor activity.   A folding variant of human alpha-lactalbumin that may form in acidic environments such as the stomach, called HAMLET, probably induces apoptosis in tumor and immature cells. The corresponding folding dynamics of alpha-lactalbumin is thus highly unusual.

When formed into a complex with Gal-T1, a galactosyltransferase, α-lactalbumin, enhances the enzyme's affinity for glucose by about 1000 times, and inhibits the ability to polymerise multiple galactose units. This gives rise to a pathway for forming lactose by converting Gal-TI to Lactose synthase.

Physical properties 

The structure of alpha-lactalbumin is well known and is composed of 123 amino acids and 4 disulfide bridges. The molecular weight is 14178 Da, and the isoelectric point is between 4.2 and 4.5. Alpha-lactalbumin has two prominent forms: holo-state and apo-state. The holo-state is the natural form--folded and bound by calcium. The apo-state occurs in acidic conditions and is associated with the release of calcium ions and beta-sheet unfolding. One of the main structural differences with beta-lactoglobulin is that it does not have any free thiol group that can serve as the starting-point for a covalent aggregation reaction. As a result, pure α-lactalbumin will not form gels upon denaturation and acidification. Alpha-LA is a Ca2+ binding protein with a single strong calcium binding spot seen below. The calcium binds to the carboxylic groups of three aspartate residues (Asp 82, 87, 88), seen in blue and to the carbonyl groups from lysine 79 and aspartate 84, seen in purple. This binding is coordinated by two water molecules (red). These residue binding sites are conserved among most species containing alpha-lactalbumin.

Evolution 

The sequence comparison of α-lactalbumin shows a strong similarity to that of lysozymes, specifically the Ca2+-binding c-lysozyme. These two proteins share much of their physical structure but contain less than half of the same amino acid sequence and therefore vary in function drastically. So, the expected evolutionary history is that gene duplication of the c-lysozyme was followed by mutation, resulting in the loss of lysozyme catalytic activity in alpha-lactalbumin. This gene predates the last common ancestor of mammals and birds, which probably puts its origin at about 300 Ma.

Functions 
Current research is finding new application of alpha-lactalbumin outside the physiological lactose production. 

Nutrition: Alpha-lactalbumin is essential for newborn nutrition. This protein provides essential amino acids and bioactive compounds necessary for optimal growth, development, and health. Alpha-LA is the most abundant whey protein in human milk and its properties have been researched to include in infant formulas to replicate mammary milk compounds. This protein is a strong source of branched amino acids, cysteine, and tryptophan residues, each with correlated health benefits.

Clinical Uses: Alpha-Lactalbumin has been researched in conjunction with many different medical conditions and is thought to correlate with positive outcomes. Many of these benefits are due to the bioactive compounds it is made of and the protein’s ability to bind complexes.

PCOS: Polycystic Ovary Syndrome (PCOS) is one disease that higher levels of alpha-La have been linked with relieving symptoms. This condition is closely linked with gut dysbiosis caused by inflammation of the intestinal lining and a microbiota imbalance. Alpha-lactalbumin promotes healthy bacterial strains such as Lactobacillus acidophilus, Bifidobacterium short, and Bifidobacterium longum. These bacteria produce short chain fatty acids (SCFA) which improve the gut biome. In a controlled study, the group that ate a diet higher in alpha-lactalbumin experienced a decrease in symptoms associated with PCOS, and higher levels of healthy bacteria. While there isn’t a cure for this condition, this could be a short-term remedy.

Mental health: Alpha-lactalbumin is a source of amino acids which are connected to improved mental health. This protein is rich in Tryptophan residues which are a precursor to serotonin, a neurotransmitter associated with positive moods. The protein also increases the plasma concentration for other large neutral amino acids (LNAAs) which help balance hormones. The cysteine residues aid in glutathione synthesis which is an important antioxidant.

Cancer: There has been extensive research on apoptotic effects that alpha-lactalbumin potentially has when it forms a complex with oleic acid called HAMLET (Human alpha-lactalbumin made lethal to tumor cells). This HAMLET complex disrupts the structure of the membrane when bound, promoting cell death to protect the integrity of the organism. This complex can translocate into the nuclei of cancerous cells, but not of healthy cells. When in cancer cells, this protein-OA complex has been shown to slow the progression of tumors in numerous studies. Alpha-lactalbumins native state does not show these same anti-cancer functions, so it is likely that the oleic acid expresses the apoptotic functions while the alpha-lactalbumin is responsible for targeting the specific cells lines such as colon, bladder, and glioblastoma cancer cells.

References

Further reading

External links 
 
 

Milk
Mammalian proteins